Bistra Stefanova Gospodinova (born 17 February 1966) is a retired Bulgarian swimmer who won a bronze medal in the 4 × 100 m medley relay at the 1985 European Aquatics Championships in Sofia. She also competed at the 1988 Summer Olympics and finished sixth in the same event. Gospodinova won the silver medal in the 100m backstroke at the 1985 Summer Universiade.

Since about 1990 she has lived in Rijeka, Croatia with her husband, Dmitr Bobev; both work as swimming coaches.

References

1966 births
Living people
Sportspeople from Sofia
Bulgarian female swimmers
Swimmers at the 1988 Summer Olympics
Olympic swimmers of Bulgaria
European Aquatics Championships medalists in swimming
20th-century Bulgarian women
21st-century Bulgarian women